Joseph Donat Raymond (January 3, 1880 – June 5, 1963) was a Canadian Senator and builder in the National Hockey League.

Biography
Born in Saint-Stanislas-de-Kostka, Quebec, Donat Raymond was a member of the Canadian Senate as a Liberal Party from 1926 to 1963. He was also head of the Canadian Arena Company that helped designed arenas throughout Canada. One of the major arenas he re-built was the Montreal Forum in 1968.  One of his final acts was to approve the financing and plans of the arena before he died. He won the Stanley Cup seven times, twice with the Montreal Maroons in 1926 and 1935, and five times with Montreal Canadiens in 1944, 1946, 1953, 1956 and 1957.

He was inducted into the Hockey Hall of Fame in 1958.

External links
 
 
 

1880 births
1963 deaths
Canadian senators from Quebec
Hockey Hall of Fame inductees
Liberal Party of Canada senators
Montreal Canadiens executives
Montreal Maroons
National Hockey League executives
National Hockey League owners
Canadian racehorse owners and breeders
People from Montérégie
Stanley Cup champions